"Forbidden Voices" is a progressive house song by Dutch DJ and record producer Martin Garrix. It was released on 6 February 2015 and on 2 March 2015 on iTunes. The song has charted in France and the Netherlands.

Music video
A music video to accompany the release of "Forbidden Voices" was first released onto YouTube on 6 February 2015 at a total length of three minutes and thirty seconds.It depicts the stages of Martin Garrix's career, such as his first live set as DJ Marty, getting signed to Spinnin' Records, playing at festivals, among many other things.

Track listing

Chart performance

Release history

References

2015 singles
2015 songs
Martin Garrix songs
Spinnin' Records singles
Songs written by Martin Garrix
Songs written by Martina Sorbara